Ceyda Torun is a Turkish-born film documentary film director and assistant director. Her best known work is Kedi, a 2016 documentary on street cats in Istanbul.

Biography 
Torun was born in Istanbul and moved to Amman, Jordan with her family at age eleven. She moved to the United States to attend high school. After graduating from Boston University with a degree in Anthropology, she returned to Turkey to work under director Reha Erdem. Upon returning to the United States, Torun co-founded production company Termite Films with cinematographer and husband Charlie Wuppermann.

Career 
Torun worked as an assistant director on the 2011 television series Time for Passion, before her first feature, Kedi, in 2016. Kedi documents the lives of street cats and the people who care for them in Torun’s native Istanbul. Kedi was well-received, and won Best First Documentary at the Critics' Choice Documentary Awards in 2017.

Torun cited her own childhood among street cats as her inspiration for the film. She intended the film to be an examination of the human condition, saying that some of its aspects “can only be gleaned from our relationships with other animals – in this case, cats.”

Filmography 

 Consuming Love (2008)
 Kedi (2016)

Awards and nominations 
In 2017, Torun won the Critics' Choice Award for Best First Documentary and was nominated for Best Director for her work on Kedi.

References

External links 

Meet Ceyda Torun— “Kedi”

Boston University alumni
Documentary film directors

Living people
People from Amman
Film people from Istanbul
Turkish film directors
Turkish women film directors
Year of birth missing (living people)